Echeconnee is an unincorporated community in Houston and Peach counties, in the U.S. state of Georgia.

History
A post office called Echoconnee was established in 1880, and remained in operation until 1935. The community takes its name from Echeconnee Creek.

References

Unincorporated communities in Houston County, Georgia
Unincorporated communities in Peach County, Georgia
Unincorporated communities in Georgia (U.S. state)